The Senegal flapshell turtle (Cyclanorbis senegalensis) is a species of turtle in the subfamily Cyclanorbinae of the family Trionychidae. The species, which is one of two species of softshell turtles in the genus Cyclanorbis, is endemic to Africa.

Geographic range
C. senegalensis is found in Benin, Burkina Faso, Cameroon, Central African Republic, Chad, Ivory Coast, Ethiopia, Gambia, Ghana, Guinea-Bissau, Liberia, Mali, Niger, Nigeria, Senegal, Sierra Leone, South Sudan, Sudan, and Togo.

Habitat
The preferred natural habitats of C. senegalensis are freshwater wetlands and savanna.

Description
The head is olive, with numerous white dots. The carapace is olive, either uniform or with small dark blotches. Hatchlings have longitudinal rows of small tubercles on the carapace. The plastron is yellowish, clouded with brown. The plastral callosities are finely granular.

Diet
C. senegalensis preys upon tadpoles, other amphibians, and fishes. Large adults of C. senegalensis have jaws strong enough to also eat freshwater clams and snails.

References

Further reading
Trape J-F, Trape S, Chirio L (2012). Lézards, crocodiles et tortues d'Afrique occidentale et du Sahara. Paris: IRD Orstom. 503 pp. . (in French).

External links
 

Cyclanorbis
Reptiles described in 1835
Taxonomy articles created by Polbot